Gordon Hodgson (13 October 1952 – April 1999) was an English footballer.

A central midfielder, Hodgson began his career at his hometown club Newcastle United but found his chances limited. He moved to Mansfield Town in 1974 became a central figure in the side, winning promotion to the Second Division in 1977. He later played for Oxford United and Peterborough United.

Hodgson died in early April 1999, aged just 46. A minute's silence in his memory was held at Field Mill before the match between Mansfield and Southend United on 10 April 1999.

References

External links
Career Stats
Tribute (Stags Classic Match Reports)

1952 births
1999 deaths
English footballers
Newcastle United F.C. players
Mansfield Town F.C. players
Oxford United F.C. players
Peterborough United F.C. players
Association football midfielders